Stovies (also stovy tatties, stoved potatoes, stovers or stovocks) is a Scottish dish based on potatoes. Recipes and ingredients vary widely but the dish contains potatoes, fat, usually  onions and often  pieces of meat. In some versions, other vegetables may also be added.

The potatoes are cooked by slow stewing in a closed pot with fat (lard, beef dripping or butter may be used) and often a  small amount of water or sometimes other liquids, such as milk, stock or meat jelly.  Stovies may be served accompanied by cold meat or oatcakes and, sometimes, with pickled beetroot.

"To stove" means "to stew" in Scots. The term is from the French adjective étuvé which translates as braised. Versions without meat may be termed barfit and those with meat as high-heelers.

See also

List of potato dishes

References

Potato dishes
Scottish cuisine
Scottish beef dishes
Meat and potatoes dishes